Zekri may refer to:

Places
Zekri, town in Algeria
Zekri, Iran, town in Iran

People
Zekri (surname)